Statistics of Guam League in the 2001 season.

Overview
Staywell Zoom won the championship.

References
RSSSF

Guam Soccer League seasons
Guam
Guam
football